Dolichuranus is an extinct genus of dicynodont therapsids from the Middle Triassic Omingonde Formation of Namibia and the Ntawere Formation of Zambia.

See also 
 List of therapsids

References 
 Chinese Fossil Vertebrates by Spencer G. Lucas

Further reading 
 

Kannemeyeriiformes
Anisian life
Middle Triassic synapsids of Africa
Triassic Namibia
Fossils of Namibia
Omingonde Formation
Fossils of Zambia
Fossil taxa described in 1973
Anomodont genera